Jonathan Carr (1942–2008) was a British journalist and author, who lived and worked primarily in Germany.

He was born in Berkhamsted, Hertfordshire.

He worked as a correspondent in turns for Reuters, Radio Free Europe, The Economist, The Financial Times, and again for The Economist. He met then-chancellor Helmut Schmidt professionally; they eventually developed a close personal friendship, and he wrote the biography Helmut Schmidt: Helmsman of Germany in 1985.

His 1993 book Goodbye Germany, occasioned by German reunification, was an international bestseller, and in 1998 he wrote Mahler: a Biography of the Austrian composer.

He died in Königswinter, North Rhine-Westphalia at the age of 66, on 12 June 2008, on the very day his final book The Wagner Clan was published.

Works 
Helmut Schmidt: Helmsman of Germany. New York: St. Martin's Press, 1985. 
Mahler: A biography. Woodstock, N.Y.: Overlook Press, 1998. 
The Wagner Clan: The Saga of Germany's Most Illustrious and Infamous Family. Atlantic Monthly Press, 2007.

References 

1942 births
2008 deaths
British male journalists
British biographers
20th-century biographers
20th-century British male writers
Male biographers
Mahler scholars
Wagner scholars